Kvesić or Kvesic/Kvesich is a Bosnian and Croatian surname. It is derived from the Turkish term kavas (from Arabic: قوّاس (qwwas) with the meaning "archer", "arrow and bow carrying guard") for a kavass by adding the Serbo-Croatian surname forming suffix -ić. 
Notable people with the surname include:
Anđelko Kvesić (born 1969), retired Bosnian footballer
Anđelo Kvesić (born 1995), Croatian karateka
Dijana Kvesić (born 1977), Bosnian swimmer
Ivan Kvesić (born 1996), Croatian karateka athlete
Josip Kvesić (born 1990), Bosnian footballer
Kornelija Kvesić (born 1963), Yugoslav and Croatian former female basketball player
Mario Kvesić (born 1992), Bosnian-Herzegovinian footballer
Matt Kvesic (born 1992), English professional rugby union player

References

Bosnian surnames
Croatian surnames